Urfa, officially known as Şanlıurfa and known in ancient times as Edessa, is the capital of Şanlıurfa Province, Turkey.

Urfa may also refer to:

Places
 Urfa (also known as Şanlıurfa and Edessa), a city in Upper Mesopotamia, present-day Urfa, Turkey
 Urfa Province (or Şanlıurfa), southeastern Turkey
 Urfa Province, Ottoman Empire (or Vilayet of Aleppo), centered on the city of Aleppo, Syria

Other uses
 Battle of Urfa (spring 1920), between the French occupying army and the Turkish National Forces, Urfa, Turkey
 Urfa biber, a dried Turkish chili pepper
 Urfa Man (circa 9000 BC), an anthropomorphological statue found near Urfa, Turkey

See also
 Urfé (disambiguation)